Ramree Township is a township of Kyaukpyu District in the Rakhine State of Myanmar. The principal town is Ramree. The local pronunciation of Ramree is Yangbye Myo.

The place has been labeled campaign of the Second World War during the Japanese occupation of Burma in the 1940s.

The island has over 300 villages and the principal town is Yanbye (Ramree). The island's streams empty into the Bay of Bengal.

References 

Townships of Rakhine State